Kenneth Wayne Brewer (November 28, 1941 – March 15, 2006) was an American poet and longtime scholar who resided in Utah, where he served as Poet Laureate.  Born in Indianapolis, Indiana, he attended Butler University and Western New Mexico University in the 1960s, then earned a master's degree in English literature from New Mexico State University, followed by a Ph.D. from the University of Utah, where he worked with Pulitzer Prize winner Henry Taylor, in 1973.  Since that time he taught a wide variety of courses at Utah State University, concentrating on mentoring creative writers at the graduate level, while publishing prolifically and speaking extensively.  He died after a nine-month battle with pancreatic cancer.

Publications 
In over three decades at Utah State, Brewer published eight volumes of his poetry as well as more than individual 300 poems, essays and reviews in literary journals. Collections of his poetry may be found in
 The Place In Between, Limberlost Press, 1998
 Lake's Edge, Woodhedge Press, 1997
 Hoping for all, Dreading Nothing, Slanting Rain Press, 1994
 A Fine Art Book of Poems with Woodcuts by Harry Taylor
 To Remember What is Lost, USU Press, 1982, 68pp. Re-issued in paperback, 1989
 The Collected Poems of Mongrel, Compost Press, 1981
 Round Again: A Cycle of Poems, published under a grant from the Utah Institute of Fine Arts, 1980
 Sum of Accidents, Chapbook Series, Alliance for the Varied Arts, 1977
 Places, Shadows, Dancing People, USU Monograph Series, Vol. XVII, No. 1, 1969, pp. 31–47, with Tom Lyons, Joyce Wood and Robert Wood.

Reviews 

 "His poems are direct, accessible and free of the arcane references or pretentious language that can make poetry feel elitist." — KUTV, Salt Lake City 
 "achingly beautiful," composed of "spare and unimposing imagery and dialogue" — Starr Coulbrooke, quoted in Continuum
 "Utah Poet Laureate Ken Brewer is known for his fine poetry and his wicked sense of humor"  — Michael Shay 
 "luminously gifted ... a man who writes of passion and earth-tending in a chunk of America in which it has begun to seem that the only passion burning for the earth is about profit" — Mary Sojourner, in Mountain Gazette

External links 
 Utah's Poet Laureate Project (2003 article)

Poets Laureate of Utah
Deaths from pancreatic cancer
Butler University alumni
Western New Mexico University alumni
New Mexico State University alumni
University of Utah alumni
Utah State University faculty
American academics of English literature
1941 births
2006 deaths
Poets from Utah
Writers from Indianapolis
20th-century American poets
20th-century American non-fiction writers
20th-century American male writers
Poets from Indiana
Deaths from cancer in Utah